The 2010 Towson Tigers football team represented Towson University in the 2010 NCAA Division I FCS football season. They were led by second-year head coach Rob Ambrose and played their home games at Johnny Unitas Stadium. They are a member of the Colonial Athletic Association. They finished the season 1–10, 0–8 in CAA play.

Schedule

References

Towson
Towson Tigers football seasons
Towson Tigers football